Louis-Marie Pilet (8 February 1815 – 13 November 1877) was a 19th-century French cellist.

Biography 
Louis-Marie Pilet studied music in Louis-Pierre Norblin's class at the Conservatoire de Paris where he gained a second prize in 1831 then a first prize in 1834.

Pilet was a cellist in the orchestras of Nantes, London and, in Paris, in the Concerts , Musard, and Théâtre italien then the Orchestre de l'Opéra national de Paris from 1852.

With Édouard Colonne as second violon and Pierre Adam as violist, he was a member of the Quatuor Lamoureux.

Both paintings are kept at the musée d'Orsay.

Pilet died in Paris on 13 November 1877.

References

Gallery

External links 
  Louis-Marie Pilet in Paris—a Musical Gazetteer

1815 births
People from Ille-et-Vilaine
1877 deaths
French classical cellists
19th-century French musicians
Conservatoire de Paris alumni
19th-century classical musicians